Emery James Staines (27 July 1874 – 28 July 1959) was an Australian rules footballer who played with St Kilda in the Victorian Football League (VFL).

References

External links 

1874 births
1959 deaths
Australian rules footballers from Victoria (Australia)
St Kilda Football Club players
Williamstown Football Club players